The 1882 Connecticut gubernatorial election was held on November 7, 1882. Democratic nominee Thomas M. Waller defeated Republican nominee Morgan Bulkeley with 51.04% of the vote.

General election

Candidates
Major party candidates
Thomas M. Waller, Democratic
Morgan Bulkeley, Republican

Other candidates
George Rogers, Prohibition
Abel P. Tanner, Greenback

Results

References

1882
Connecticut
Gubernatorial